Quello Cocha or Qillwaqucha (Quechua qillwa, qiwlla, qiwiña gull, qucha lake, "gull lake",  also spelled Quellhuacocha) is a mountain at a small lake of that name in the Andes of Peru which reaches a height of approximately  . It is located in the Huancavelica Region, Churcampa Province, Chinchihuasi District, and in the Tayacaja Province, Colcabamba District.

References

Mountains of Peru
Mountains of Huancavelica Region
Lakes of Peru
Lakes of Huancavelica Region